The FIL European Luge Championships 1967 took place in Königssee, West Germany. It was the first time the championships were held after being cancelled from 1963 to 1966.

Men's singles

Women's singles

Men's doubles

Medal table

References
FIL-Luge.org list of European luge champions  - Accessed January 31, 2008.
Men's doubles European champions
Men's singles European champions
Women's singles European champions

FIL European Luge Championships
1967 in luge
Luge in Germany
1976 in German sport